Sally Gifford Piper (born September 30, 1981), usually credited as Sally Gifford, is a Canadian or American actress.  She hosted CBC Television's national children's show, The-X.  
In 2013 she gained widespread attention for appearing in a viral video showing her appearance radically transformed by Photoshop.
In 2014 she appeared in Farmed and Dangerous, a four-part webisode comedy series.

Early life
Gifford was born on September 30, 1981. She attended high school at Northern Secondary School in Toronto.
Gifford performed at Theatre Kingston and the Thousand Island Playhouse, while attending Queen's University.
Plays she performed on stage include Lions in the Streets (1999),
The River (2000),
Perfect Pie (2001),
and Hay Fever (2001).
She attended the American Academy of Dramatic Arts in New York City after graduating Queen’s.

TV and film
In 2004, Gifford become the host of the CBC's The-X. 
She was also selected to host the "Battle of the Mascots", a kids segment, that was part of CBC's coverage of the 2004 Grey Cup.

In the 2005 she appeared with Michael Ironside in the short film On That Day about the horrors of war.  She's also guest starred on various TV shows, including 1-800-Missing (2003), Radio Free Roscoe (2003), Street Time (2002), and G-Spot (2005).

In 2007 she appeared as Marissa, in the One Way.
She was also one of 16 improvisational actors in the film subHysteria.

Personal life
Gifford is married to Tim Piper, who directed the viral video featuring her.  He also served as one of the two creators, writers, and executive producers for Farmed and Dangerous, which she appeared in.

References

External links

Canadian stage actresses
Canadian television hosts
Queen's University at Kingston alumni
Living people
American Academy of Dramatic Arts alumni
1981 births
Canadian women television hosts